Colombo Institute of Research and Psychology  (CIRP)  is a private higher education institute in Sri Lanka located in Colombo, the commercial capital of the country. Main campus is housed in two main units known as Sea Side Campus and Land Side Campus facing each other on Colombo – Galle main road.

Incorporated in June 2010, CIRP was granted registration as an awarding body by Tertiary & Vocational Education Commission of Sri Lanka in December 2010.

Colombo Institute of Research & Psychology (CIRP) mainly provides higher education and training in psychology and related areas.

History
Colombo Institute of Research & Psychology (CIRP) was established in 2010 with the aim of popularizing and promoting psychology education, psychological research and practice of psychology in the country.  Capacity building in the field of mental health and establishing psychological services in par with international standards is one of the key goals for launching the institute.

Goals
 Promote psychology as a subject of interest with direct industry relevance among the local student community.
 Promote research linked to various fields of psychology, producing a key piece of publication annually.
 Produce a minimum of 100 professionals in research and psychology by the end of 2011 and 100 professionals each year thereafter.
 Make available to interested individuals an internationally recognized degree in psychology with direct industry relevance by 2012.
 Establish a community of academics and professionals in research and psychology, with an aim to sharing knowledge and developing the existing body of knowledge over time.

Progress

CIRP has come to a recognition agreement with university of Hertfordshire, UK; giving the students eligibility to gain a world recognized qualification and also providing them with the option of transferring to the affiliated Universities. Colombo Institute of Research & Psychology is also registered under the Tertiary and Vocational Education Commission of Sri Lanka to offer Diplomas in Psychology in Sri Lanka and is recognized by the Maldivian Qualifications Authority as a Tertiary Education Institute.

MSc Applied Psychology and MSc   in Business Psychology gives deeper knowledge in the respected area of Psychology studies. Undergraduate courses BSc (Hons) Psychology, BSc in Sports Psychology, BSc in Business Psychology cover various popular study areas. Professional Programs like Higher National Certificate in Psychology and Higher National Diploma in Psychology have been appreciated by students who hope to enter the field of Psychology. Certificate and Diploma programs in child & adolescent psychology  in diverse Psychology fields are very popular among students who are interested in short term courses.

CIRP is the only academic institution in Sri Lanka that operates with its own psychotherapy and research divisions providing internships to students in therapy, counseling, research and other related areas of study.

Facilities
 CIRP owns a multi facet psychotherapy centre and a counseling laboratory.
 CIRP is the only Sri Lankan institute with a neuropsychology laboratory which is equipped for conducting researches related to neuropsychology.

Student life
 The Student Union of CIRP
The student union of CIRP continues as a student council which ensures the respective needs of CIRP’s student body are heard and represented. The student union takes the responsibility of organizing social & recreational student activities and organizing student career guidance services. Career guidance services are managed by both CIRP administration and by the CIRP’s Student Union.
 CIRP Toastmasters Club
The Toastmasters Club of CIRP gives the students an opportunity to improve their speaking and leadership skills. A Toastmasters meeting is a learn-by-doing workshop in which participants hone their speaking and leadership skills in a no-pressure atmosphere.
 D' Psyched
D' Psyched  is a student singing group which consists of students who are passionate about music and singing. It gives the students to bring out their hidden talents. D' Psyched singing choir was the winner of the group singing category of the Tantalize   2013 competition, the biggest university level talent search in Sri Lanka organized by the Student Activity Club of APIIT Sri Lanka.

ICAP Sri Lanka 2014
International Conference on Applied Psychology

The 1st international Conference on Applied Psychology (ICAP),organized by the Colombo Institute of Research and Psychology was held on the 22 to 24 October 2014 at the Bandaranaike Memorial International Conference Hall (BMICH) Sri Lanka. Theme of the conference was “Mental Health in Diverse Contexts-Research and Implications”. The launching of the first ever South-Asian Journal of Psychology was also taken place at ICAP 2014.

ICAP Sri Lanka 2015 
International Conference on Applied Psychology

The conference on Applied Psychology by CIRP was held successfully for the second time with the support if the student volunteers and the staff members. It was held from the 28th to the 30th of August at BMICH.

See also 
Education in Sri Lanka
Sri Lankan universities

References

External links
 Official website

Medical and health organisations based in Sri Lanka
Universities and colleges in Colombo
Educational institutions established in 2010
2010 establishments in Sri Lanka